The effective one-body or EOB formalism is an analytical approach to the gravitational two-body problem in general relativity. It was introduced by Alessandra Buonanno and Thibault Damour in 1999. It aims to describe all different phases of the two-body dynamics in a single analytical method. The theory allows calculations to be made in particular limits, such as post-Newtonian theory in the early inspiral, when the objects are at large separation, or black hole perturbation theory, when the two objects differ greatly in mass. In addition, it leads to results faster than numerical relativity. Rather than being considered distinct from these other approaches to the two-body problem, the EOB formalism is a way to resum information from other methods. It does so by mapping the general two-body problem to that of a test particle in an effective metric. The method was used in the data analysis of gravitational wave detectors such as LIGO and Virgo.

References 

General relativity
Gravitational-wave astronomy